Abdullah Al-Fahad (born 15 June 1994) is a Saudi Arabian football player who plays as a centre back for Al-Raed.

Honours
Al-Shabab
 King Cup: 2014
 Saudi Super Cup: 2014

References

External links
 

Living people
1994 births
People from Riyadh Province
Association football defenders
Saudi Arabian footballers
Saudi Arabia youth international footballers
Al-Shabab FC (Riyadh) players
Al-Faisaly FC players
Al-Raed FC players
Saudi Professional League players